"Famous For (I Believe)" is a song by American Christian pop artist Tauren Wells featuring Jenn Johnson. It was released on January 10, 2020, as the second single from his sophomore studio album, Citizen of Heaven (2020). Wells co-wrote the song with Alexis Slifer, Chuck Butler, Jordan Sapp, and Krissy Nordhoff. Chuck Butler collaborated with Jordan Sapp on producing the single. 

"Famous For (I Believe)" peaked at No. 3 on the US Hot Christian Songs chart, registering as Well's sixth and Johnson's first top ten single. The song also went on to peak at No. 15 on the Bubbling Under Hot 100 chart, thus becoming the highest-charting single for both acts. "Famous For (I Believe)" has garnered a Grammy Award nomination for Best Contemporary Christian Music Performance/Song at the 2021 Grammy Awards. "Famous For (I Believe)" received nominations for the GMA Dove Award Song of the Year and Pop/Contemporary Recorded Song of the Year at the 2021 GMA Dove Awards.

Background
In April 2020, Tauren Wells shared the story behind the song in a worship service at Christian Life Austin, saying:

Composition
"Famous For (I Believe)" is composed in the key of G minor with a tempo of 172 beats per minute. Wells' vocal range spans from F4 to B♭5.

Music videos
On January 10, 2020, Tauren Wells published the official lyric video of "Famous For (I Believe)" on YouTube. On May 28, 2020, Wells released the official music video for "Famous For (I Believe)" featuring Jenn Johnson and Christine D'Clario, which was filmed at Lakewood Church in Houston, Texas. Wells released an acoustic performance video of the song on YouTube on September 17, 2020.

Accolades

Track listing

Charts

Weekly charts

Year-end charts

Certifications

Release history

References

2020 songs
2020 singles
Tauren Wells songs
Songs written by Tauren Wells
Songs written by Chuck Butler